Khalid Aziz (15 July 1937 – 2 July 2011) was a Pakistani cricket umpire. He stood in three Test matches between 1978 and 1992 and seven ODI games between 1977 and 1993.

During the West Indian tour of Pakistan in 1980–81 he protested publicly against the pressure officials put on umpires to make decisions in favour of the home team, and was sacked. He was not appointed to officiate at another first-class match until 1988.

He was the cousin of the Test cricketer Farooq Hamid.

See also
 List of Test cricket umpires
 List of One Day International cricket umpires

References

External links

1937 births
2011 deaths
Cricketers from Lahore
Pakistani Test cricket umpires
Pakistani One Day International cricket umpires
Pakistani cricketers
Pakistan Universities cricketers
Punjab University cricketers
Lahore cricketers
Lahore Greens cricketers
Lahore A cricketers
Punjab (Pakistan) cricketers
Pakistan Eaglets cricketers
North Zone cricketers